Jean White (1941 – 8 November 2010) was the founding pastor within the Metropolitan Community Church (MCC) in London. She was a nurse, midwife, missionary, pastor, counselor, and campaigner for LGBTQ community and their inclusion in the Church.

She received her training as a State Registered Nurse at the London Teaching Hospital, Whitechapel, London. Later she received training as a Midwife in Bristol and at the Elsie Ingles School of Midwifery in Edinburgh, Scotland and undertook a course in Tropical Diseases at the Hospital for Tropical Diseases in Liverpool. In 1963–64, White studied at the International Bible Training Institute in Burgess Hill, Sussex, and in Stockholm, Sweden. In 1964 she went as a medical missionary to Macao. She served as a missionary in Asia from 1964–70. Three of those years were spent under “compound arrest” in the “no-man’s area”, between Macao and the mainland of China, during the Red Guard uprising. While in China (Asia) Jean became aware she needed to be honest about her sexuality and when she returned to London she came out as a lesbian and joined a group called Fellowship of Christ the Liberator, which was a prayer group for the LGBTQ.

As founding pastor of the MCC, White served on the denomination's Board of Elders and served the original Metropolitan Community Church of London for many years. She worked as director of World Church Extension of the denomination. She was pastor of MCC, South London, at the time of her death on 8 November 2010, aged 69, following a battle with pancreatic cancer. She is survived by her long-time partner, Mary Smail, an accomplished church musician and MCC lay leader.

References

External links
Jean White Archive

1941 births
2010 deaths
Nurses from London
Deaths from cancer in England
Congregationalist missionaries in China
Deaths from pancreatic cancer
LGBT Protestant clergy
English LGBT rights activists
English LGBT people
Metropolitan Community Church clergy
Female Christian missionaries
English midwives
English Congregationalist missionaries
British expatriates in China
Christian missionaries in Macau
Christian medical missionaries